James Arthur "Rube" Parnham (February 1, 1894 – November 25, 1963) was a Major League Baseball pitcher for the 1916 and 1917 Philadelphia Athletics.

Parnham started only five games for the Athletics, completing two of them. His career record in the majors was 2–2. However, he was acquired by the International League's Baltimore Orioles during the 1917 season, and over the next 10 seasons, he would compile a 139–60 record for Jack Dunn's ballclub.

1919 was Rube's breakout year. He led the league in wins (28) and strikeouts (187), as the Orioles dynasty won their first pennant. After starting out 5–0 in 1920, Parnham quit the team in 1920 to pitch in a Pennsylvania industrial league. He rejoined in the middle of the 1922 season.

In 1923, he had another outstanding performance, going 33–7 with 28 complete games. He managed to outshine even future Hall of Famer Lefty Grove, who was on the same team. The 33 wins are a 20th-century International League record and Baltimore won another pennant.

Ever unpredictable, Parnham quit the team again the following season and pitched his last professional game in 1927. He was later described as the "dumbest man off the field – and the smartest on."

In 1957, Parnham was elected to the International League Hall of Fame. He died in 1963, and is buried at Mount Vernon Cemetery in McKeesport, Pennsylvania.

References

External links

1894 births
1963 deaths
Burials in Pennsylvania
Major League Baseball pitchers
Philadelphia Athletics players
Huntington Blue Sox players
Raleigh Capitals players
Durham Bulls players
Baltimore Orioles (IL) players
Louisville Colonels (minor league) players
Reading Keystones players
Newark Bears (IL) players
Baseball players from Pennsylvania